In the Name of the King: A Dungeon Siege Tale, or simply In the Name of the King, is a 2007 action-fantasy film directed by Uwe Boll and starring Jason Statham, Claire Forlani, Leelee Sobieski, John Rhys-Davies, Ron Perlman and Ray Liotta. It is inspired by the Dungeon Siege video game series. The English-language film was an international (German, American, and Canadian) co-production and filmed in Canada. It premiered at the Brussels Festival of Fantastic Films in April 2007 and was released in theatres in November 2007.

Upon its release, the film was a major critical and commercial failure, receiving overwhelmingly negative reviews from critics and grossing $13.1 million against a budget of $60 million.

Plot
In the kingdom of Ehb, a man known only as Farmer is living a happy life with his wife, Solana, and their young son, Zeph, in the town of Stonebridge. One day, the town gets attacked by the Krug, creatures known to be primitive and animal-like. They surprise the people by taking up arms, donning armour and are fighting with courage, intelligence and ferocity. It is all because they are magically controlled by Gallian, a powerful Magus who has become sadistic and megalomaniacal, and seeks to conquer and rule Ehb. During the attack, Farmer, along with his friend, Norick and his brother-in-law, Bastian, fights off the Krug. He fails to save Zeph; who is killed by Gallian via a Krug avatar. Through a Krug, Gallian claims to be unable to read Farmer. Solana and other Stonebridge inhabitants are taken prisoner.

King Konreid, Commander Tarish and Ehb's soldiers arrive at Stonebridge to survey the damage and recruit others to join their army. Merick, another Magus who serves Konreid, tries to learn of Farmer's identity when he notices Norick, who he believes he has seen before. Farmer, Norick and Bastian set off on their own to find Solana. Meanwhile, Merick's daughter, Muriella, who fell in love with Gallian, ends her romance with him after seeing his dark nature and realizing that he only trained her power so he can take it away. She confesses to her father, who believes that her love for Gallian has created an imbalance of their powers in Gallian's favour. Meanwhile, Konreid's selfish and immature nephew, Duke Fallow is in league with Gallian and he seeks to take his uncle's place. He attempts to poison Konreid and takes a company of Ehb soldiers for his own. Soon after, Konreid heals and leads his army to go and fight Gallian's forces.

Going through Sedgwick Forest, Farmer and his companions encounter the reclusive nymphs led by Elora, who leads them out of the forest. When they attempt to rescue Solana from the Krug, Farmer gets knocked out, and Norick and Bastian get captured. While Farmer is being hanged by another one of Gallian's avatars, he kills the avatar, frees himself and is rescued by Merick. Farmer is taken to Konreid and his army's camp, where Merick reveals that Farmer is Konreid's long lost son and his real name is Camden Konreid. He explains that many years ago, a young Farmer was present during a battle at a place known as Oxley Pass, where he was found by Norick. Norick was considered to be the adoptive father, but Farmer was cared for by Stonebridge's inhabitants and was kept safe from all the chaos that ravaged Ehb. Konreid and Farmer both disapprove of Merick's claims.

Konreid catches Fallow, in his treachery, which leaves Fallow only his personal guard as the company turns from him and joins the rest of the army. Soon after, a battle erupts between Ehb's army and the Krug. Ehb's army, along with Farmer, eventually gain the upper hand and force the Krug to retreat, but Fallow succeeds in mortally wounding Konreid. After the battle, Konreid and Farmer learn that they both share similar knowledge as Konreid declares Farmer his son with his last breath and dies. Meanwhile, Tarish challenges Fallow to a duel. Tarish wins and Fallow is taken away. Farmer, who is now the new king, readies everybody for the next battle.

Meanwhile, Norick, Bastian and Solana are taken to Gallian's lair at Christwind Hold. Norick is killed while he and Bastian fight the Krug. Solana is taken to Gallian, who can sense Farmer within her, who reveals that Solana is pregnant with Farmer's second child. Going on a mission to infiltrate Gallian's lair, Farmer is joined by Merick, Muriella and Elora, who has sided with Ehb against Gallian, while Tarish and the remaining army hold off against the advancing Krug. Merick magically enters the lair and fights Gallian, who manages to kill Merick. Farmer and Muriella manage to go into the lair as well, but Elora stays behind.

Farmer finds Solana and fights Gallian in a sword battle. When Gallian resorts to using his magic to gain the upper hand, he prepares to kill him until Solana stabs him in the back. Muriella arrives and tries to save Farmer but Gallian defeats Muriella by weakening her magic. With him wounded, Farmer quickly defeats Gallian by slitting his throat and killing him. Gallian's magic influence goes away and the Krug go back to being primitive, saving Bastian and the prisoners, and Tarish and his battered forces. Having finally avenged his son, Farmer and Solana are happily reunited as the kingdom is saved.

Cast
 Jason Statham as Farmer / Camden Konreid
 Leelee Sobieski as Muriella
 John Rhys-Davies as Merick
 Ron Perlman as Norick
 Claire Forlani as Solana
 Kristanna Loken as Elora
 Matthew Lillard as Duke Fallow
 Ray Liotta as Gallian
 Burt Reynolds as King Konreid
 Brian White as Commander Tarish
 Mike Dopud as General Backler
 Will Sanderson as Bastian
 Tania Saulnier as Talwyn
 Gabrielle Rose as Delinda
 Terence Kelly as Trumaine
 Colin Ford as Zeph

Production
The production budget was $60 million, making it Uwe Boll's most expensive film production to date.

Boll has said that two versions will be produced due to length. The first will run for 127 minutes as a single movie trimmed down for cinematic release. The second, a director's cut, was made for a DVD release and ran 155 minutes.
The film was shot near the Municipality of Sooke, the westernmost area of the Greater Victoria, Capital Regional District (CRD), British Columbia. Locals and First Nations people were recruited as extras and for other duties.

Visual effects were added in post-production. Companies included Elektrofilm, Frantic Films, The Orphanage, PICTORION das werk, Rocket Science VFX, Technicolor Creative Services, TVT postproduction, and upstart! Animation.

Soundtrack
The German power metal band Blind Guardian recorded the movie's main theme, "Skalds and Shadows". The British progressive metal band Threshold contributed the song "Pilot in the Sky of Dreams" from their album Dead Reckoning. The Swedish power metal band, HammerFall, also contributed a track, "The Fire Burns Forever". Wolfgang Herold was the executive soundtrack producer.

Reception

Box office
In the Name of the King was a box office bomb, grossing $2.98 million in its United States opening, not cracking that week's top ten. It had grossed $10.3 million worldwide, including $2.47 million in Germany, $1.39 million in Russia and $1.22 million in Spain. Afterwards, Uwe Boll announced that this would be his first and last movie with a large budget.

Critical reception
The film received extremely negative reviews from critics. The website's critics consensus reads: "Featuring mostly wooden performances, laughable dialogue, and shoddy production values, In the Name of the King fulfills all expectations of an Uwe Boll film." The film is also ranked in that site's 100 worst reviewed films of the 2000s and in 2008, Time listed the film on their list of top ten worst video games movies. Metacritic reported the film had an average score of 15 out of 100, based on 11 reviews — indicating "overwhelming dislike." 
Many critics have attacked the film's close resemblances to other fantasy films, especially the popular Lord of the Rings films.

The film was nominated for five Razzie Awards, including Worst Picture, Worst Screenplay, Worst Supporting Actor (Burt Reynolds) and Worst Supporting Actress (Leelee Sobieski), with Uwe Boll winning Worst Director.

Sequels

Despite being considered a bomb, Boll filmed a sequel titled In the Name of the King 2: Two Worlds. Filming began on December 1, 2010, and it was released in 2011. The film stars Dolph Lundgren and Natassia Malthe.

A third film, In the Name of the King 3: The Last Mission, was filmed in 2013 but not released until 2014. The film starred Dominic Purcell, with Boll returning to direct.

Home media 
The DVD, released on April 15, 2008, does not include the 156-minute version. The Blu-ray release in December 2008 contains this edition. 813,147 units were sold, gathering a revenue of $14,865,984, more than its box office grossing.

See also
 List of films based on video games

References

External links
 
 
 
 
 
 Interviews at Movieset.com

2007 films
2000s action adventure films
2000s fantasy adventure films
20th Century Fox films
American action adventure films
American fantasy adventure films
American sword and sorcery films
Brightlight Pictures films
Canadian action adventure films
Canadian fantasy adventure films
Canadian sword and sorcery films
Dungeon Siege
2000s English-language films
English-language Canadian films
English-language German films
Films based on role-playing video games
Films directed by Uwe Boll
Films shot in British Columbia
German action adventure films
German fantasy adventure films
Golden Raspberry Award winning films
Live-action films based on video games
Works based on Microsoft video games
2000s American films
2000s Canadian films
2000s German films